Poecilogramma is a genus of African sickle-bearing bush crickets in the tribe Pardalotini, described by Karsch in 1887.

Species
The Orthoptera Species File lists:
Poecilogramma annulifemur Karsch, 1887
Poecilogramma cloetensi Griffini, 1908
Poecilogramma striatifemur Karsch, 1887 - type species

References

Phaneropterinae
Tettigoniidae genera